Philagoria (minor planet designation: 274 Philagoria) is a typical Main belt asteroid.

It was discovered by Johann Palisa on 3 April 1888 in Vienna. He named it for Philagoria, a club in Olmütz (Olomouc).

References

External links
 
 

Background asteroids
Philagoria
Philagoria
18880403